is a pinball video game developed by Nintendo and HAL Laboratory and published by Nintendo for the Nintendo Entertainment System. It is based on a Game & Watch unit of the same name, and was first released for the Famicom in Japan in 1984. It was later released as an arcade game for the Nintendo VS. System in Japan and North America in 1984. In 1985, it was a launch game for the Nintendo Entertainment System in North America.

Gameplay
The player controls the paddles of a virtual pinball machine.  Two screens represent the traditional pinball table plus a bonus mode. The player launches a ball with the plunger from the first screen—the bottom of the pinball table—through the top of the screen to the second screen. Play moves to the first screen if the ball falls through the bottom of the top screen and returns to the top screen if the ball is hit back through the space at the top of the first screen. The player controls the flippers on either screen to deflect the ball to keep it from falling off the bottom of the lower screen.

Pinball has a secondary Breakout-like mode, which the player reaches by hitting the ball into a bonus hole that takes the player to a bonus stage to control Mario carrying a platform. The object of this mode is to rescue Pauline who had debuted with Mario in Donkey Kong (1981). The player achieves this by bouncing the ball off Mario's platform and hitting various targets, the destruction of which also earns points. When the blocks under her are all gone, she will drop. Catching her on Mario's platform earns bonus points, but allowing her to hit the ground causes the player to lose.

Re-releases
Pinball was re-released on NES in 1985, and for the Family Computer Disk System on May 30, 1989.

The game is unlockable within the 2001 games Dōbutsu no Mori for Nintendo 64 and Animal Crossing for GameCube. The latter can be played on a Game Boy Advance via a link cable. In 2002, Pinball was re-released for the e-Reader on the Game Boy Advance.

Pinball was released on Virtual Console for the Wii on November 19, 2006 in North America, December 2 in Japan, and December 15 in PAL region, and on Wii U on October 24, 2013. It was released on Nintendo Switch Online on May 26, 2022.

Reception 
In Japan, Game Machine listed VS. Pinball in its October 1, 1984 issue as being the twenty-fourth most-successful table arcade unit of the month.

Notes

References

External links
 Pinball at NinDB
 

1984 video games
Nintendo Entertainment System games
Famicom Disk System games
Nintendo arcade games
Nintendo games
Nintendo e-Reader games
Nintendo Switch Online games
Nintendo Switch games
Nintendo Vs. Series games
Pinball video games
Video games developed in Japan
Virtual Console games for Wii U
Multiplayer and single-player video games
Mario spin-off games
Virtual Console games for Wii
Hamster Corporation games